Toby Simkin is a theatrical producer and impresario most notable for his work on Broadway and off-Broadway and in London's West End.  As of 2004, he is working throughout China, living in Shanghai developing a national theatre network and producing films and musicals for import and export.

Early life 

Born 21 April 1964, son of Australian Brigadier General M.B. Simkin, CBE, KStJ (d. 2003) and Irene Simkin, in Chalfont St Giles, Buckinghamshire, England and raised in Australia in a military family, that later became a diplomatic family, Toby has lived in many countries experiencing different cultures.  Schooled in Washington DC and Brisbane, Australia.  Toby has 2 brothers and 1 sister.  In childhood wanting to be an archaeologist.  Started in theatre in the early 1980s, winning the Elizabeth Bequest Scholarship in Australia.  Produced and directed his first show at the age of 18, "The Long and the Short and the Tall" which received positive reviews.

Theatre 

On Broadway, his producing credits include various Tony Award winning shows.  He produces shows regularly in London's West End and throughout the world.  He has produced, managed and/or marketed over 150 productions.

Toby has co-produced shows that have collectively garnered 3 Tony Awards (and 5 nominations), 7 Drama Desk Awards, 4 Outer Critics Circle Awards, 2 Lucille Lortel Awards, 3 Drama League Awards, 1 Theatre World Award, 1 Olivier Award, 3 OBIE Awards and 1 Pulitzer Prize. Shows that Toby has been involved in marketing have garnered an additional 243 Tony Nominations and 96 wins.

Broadway 

On Broadway, his producing credits include the Tony Award winning Long Day's Journey into Night  (starring Vanessa Redgrave, Brian Dennehy and Philip Seymour Hoffman); I Am My Own Wife (starring Jefferson Mays); Death of a Salesman (starring Brian Dennehy) plus The Crucible (starring Liam Neeson and Laura Linney); Marc Salem's Mind Games; The Price; and Victor/Victoria (starring Dame Julie Andrews).

He is a member of the League of American Theatres and Producers.

Off Broadway

Off-Broadway, he was Executive Producer of Savion Glover's NYC and national tours of Improvography  I & II, Classical Savion, Matt & Ben, Savion at the Rialto and for Celebrity's Constellation in Europe, Batir, A Hot Minute (both directed/choreographed by Wayne Cilento), An American Canteen in Paris and Spotlight Broadway.

West End

On the West End/London his producing credits include, The Female of the Species (starring Dame Eileen Atkins) I Am My Own Wife (starring Jefferson Mays); Death of a Salesman (starring Brian Dennehy); and other production credits include Blood Brothers (starring Stephanie Lawrence), Damn Yankees (starring Jerry Lewis), RENT, Sideman and Václav Havel's Temptation (starring Countess Rula Lenska and Sylvester McCoy).

Internationally

Around the world, other production and producing credits include producing the New Year's Eve engagement of Plácido Domingo, José Carreras and Luciano Pavarotti in The Three Tenors (Vancouver); Relatively Speaking (Washington D.C.); and in Canada, Driving Miss Daisy; Something in the Air, Blood Brothers; Connie Francis; The Ecstasy of Rita Joe; Damn Yankees (starring Davis Gaines); Arsenic and Old Lace; Love Letters (starring Victor Garber and Kate Nelligan); Godspell reunion and the Tribute to Gilda Radner (with Paul Shaeffer, John Candy, Martin Short, Andrea Martin, Marvin Hamlisch and Dave Thomas for CBC TV); Forever Plaid and the Shanghai Ballet's Tour of The White Haired Girl.  In China, 42nd Street and Elton John and Tim Rice's Aida.  In Australia, over 40 productions, for many companies. 

Toby has managed marketing and produced numerous shows for Microsoft.  Other industrials include the SkyDome Opening Ceremonies; Volkswagen EuroVan Launch; Toronto Arts Awards and The Dinosaur World Tour.

Theatrical Web Visionary 

"Toby Simkin is the man pushing the theatre industry kicking and screaming, into Cyberspace"
                  --Alexander Stevens, The Boston TAB.

Toby served as President and chief operating officer of Theatre.com Inc., a company he founded as Buy Broadway in 1995, which he started as a way to reach more international ticket buyers for his production of Victor/Victoria.  In March 1997, Toby (in partnership with Microsoft) produced the first live Broadcast over the net for the Broadway opening night of Annie.  Then followed doing similar video broadcasts for Les Misérables, Jerry Lewis's Damn Yankees (from London) and others. Toby took his internet business public in 1998 and sold in 2000, converting a substantial portion to shares in the Broadway Television Network (where he became VP).  Prior to selling his company, he personally produced the vast majority of online marketing campaigns and websites for over 100 Broadway shows and 50 companies on Broadway and in the West End.  He has been a consultant to Music Theatre International, the world's leading licensor of musical shows, for 15 years.

"Toby Simkin is a virtual Lewis & Clark on the e-commerce frontier"
                  --Small Business Computing Magazine, March 1, 2000, by Doug Gantenbein

Future 

Toby controls worldwide rights to various film and stage properties, including the forthcoming motion picture USD $14m budgeted movie "The Sacrifice of Yang GuiFei" (based on the story of Yang GuiFei) along with "Tea 4 Two" and "The Great Big Chinese Show".

References

External links 

 
 Sacrifice of Yang GuiFei 
 I Am My Own Wife 
 Death of a Salesman 

British theatre managers and producers
1964 births
Living people
People from Chalfont St Giles